The Parliamentary Office of Science and Technology (POST) is the Parliament of the United Kingdom's in-house source of independent, balanced and accessible analysis of public policy issues related to science and technology. POST serves both Houses of Parliament (the House of Commons and the House of Lords).

It strives to ensure that MPs and Peers can have confidence in its analyses should they wish to cite them in debate. These principles are reflected in the structure of POST’s Board with members from the Commons and Lords together with distinguished scientists and engineers from the wider world.

History

Since 1939, a group of MPs and peers interested in science and technology, through the first parliamentary "All Party Group",   the UK Parliamentary and Scientific Committee (P&S), had encouraged UK Parliamentarians to explore the implications of scientific developments for society and public policy. As the UK economy became more dependent on technological progress, and the varied effects of technology (especially on the environment) became more apparent, it was felt that UK Parliament needed its own resources on such issues. Parliamentarians not only required access to knowledge and insights into the implications of technology for their constituents and society, but also needed to exercise their scrutiny functions over UK government legislation and administration. This thinking was also influenced by the fact that specialised parliamentary science and technology organisations already existed overseas.

P&S members (Sir Ian Lloyd MP, Sir Trevor Skeet MP, Sir Gerry Vaughan MP, Lords Kennet, Gregson and Flowers among others) visited already established organisations in the US, Germany and France, and this reinforced their view that modern Parliaments needed their own ‘intelligence’ on science and technology-related issues. Initially they asked the then Thatcher government to fund such services at Westminster but were asked first to demonstrate a real need. This led to the P&S creating a charitable foundation to raise funds from P&S members.

The parliamentary reaction was positive and led to the appointment of a first Director, Dr Michael Norton.  In 1989, POST was formally established as a charitable foundation, though not an internal part of Parliament.

POST had attracted more resources by 1992 and then recruited 3 specialist science advisers and began its fellowship programme with the UK research councils.

In 1992 the House of Commons Information Committee, supported by the House of Lords, recommended that Parliament should itself fund POST for 3 years, and a subsequent review in 1995 extended this for a further 5 years. This was the result of POST demonstrating real interest and demand from MPs and peers.

POST's financial reliance on donations from bodies external to Parliament, even those as prestigious as the Royal Society, had always slightly compromised the perceived independence of the office.

From 1997 the chair of the POST board was appointed by government Whips. Since then, chairs have been Dr Ian Gibson MP 1997-2001, Dr Phyllis Starkey MP 2001-2005, and Dr Ashok Kumar MP 2005-2010. Dr Kumar died shortly before the UK 2010 General Election.  Since then, subject to parliamentary approval, the Chair of POST has been Adam Afiyie, MP.

In 1998 Professor David Cope took over as Director of POST. He guided the Office towards the goal of establishing POST as a permanent office of the UK Parliament - and dramatically expanded its staffing, wider links and more general recognition of its role as a special, distinctive, institution that the UK Parliament had agreed, enthusiastically, to endorse.

In 2001, both Houses decided that POST should indeed be established as a permanent bicameral institution, funded exclusively by Parliament itself, through the two Houses, in a ratio of 70%/30%, Commons/Lords.

In 2009, POST celebrated its 20th anniversary with, among other events, a special conference, arranged by the Director, Prof Cope, on "Images of the Future".  The keynote participants were the Hon. Bart Gordon, Chair of the US House of Representatives' Committee on Science and Technology and Dr Jim Dator of the University of Hawaii Futures Research Centre, along with many other Members and staff of Parliaments across the world.

Because of the enthusiasm of Members of both Houses, POST had enjoyed a unique status within Parliament. It was from its inception attached administratively to the House of Commons COMMISSION (though always with its link to the House of Lords.)

This arrangement was intended specifically to distinguish the office and its functions from the Libraries of either House.  These conduct non peer-reviewed "studies", of varying quality.  POST - on the other hand - was expected to provide proactive analysis and options, freed from the immediate pressure of political or administrative expectations, trying to embrace futures thinking, and above all, to subject all its work to the most critical peer review analysis.

POST'S Director, Prof David Cope, returned to Cambridge University in 2012 and Dr Chris Tyler was appointed to lead POST by parliamentary authorities.

Dr Tyler left POST in 2017 for a policy position at University College London.

The Acting Directorship of POST was taken over by a longstanding staff member, Dr Chandrika Nath. In 2018, in an acknowledgement of POST's immutable science and technology assessment role, she was appointed Executive Director of the international Scientific Committee on Antarctic Research, the highly prestigious intergovernmental organisation.

Dr Grant Hill-Cawthorne (University of Sydney) became Head of POST from May 2018.

Activities

Science and technology in parliament
Most parliamentarians do not have a scientific or technological background but science and technology issues are increasingly integral to public policy. Parliamentarians are bombarded daily with lobbying, public enquiries and media stories about science and technology. These cover diverse areas such as medical advances, environmental issues and global communications. POST helps parliamentarians examine such issues effectively by providing information resources, in depth analysis and impartial advice. POST works closely with a wide range of organisations involved in science and technology, including select committees, all-party parliamentary groups, government departments, scientific societies, policy think tanks, business, academia and research funders.

Aim
POST's aim is to inform parliamentary debate through:
Publishing POSTnotes (short briefing notes) and longer reports. POSTnotes can be downloaded from the publications section of the POST website. Both focus on current science and technology issues and aim to anticipate policy implications for parliamentarians.
Supporting select committees, with informal advice, oral briefings, data analyses, background papers or follow-up research. Committees may approach POST for such advice at any stage in an inquiry.
Informing both Houses on public dialogue activities in science and technology.
Organising discussions to stimulate debate on a wide range of topical issues, from small working groups to large lectures.
Horizon scanning to anticipate issues of science and technology that are likely to impact on policy

How POST works
A parliamentary board guides POST's choice of subjects. A team of advisers conduct analyses, drawing on a wide range of external expertise. All reports and POSTnotes are externally peer reviewed, and scrutinised by the board before publication.

POST's work falls into four topical areas:
Biological Sciences and Health
Physical Sciences and ICT
Environment and Energy
Social Sciences

International activities
POST is a member of the European Parliamentary Technology Assessment network, which brings together parliamentary organisations throughout Europe sharing information and working on joint projects. POST also liaises with science and technology organisations across the world.

Between November 2005 to 2009, POST, collaborating with four of its sister organisations - at the Danish, Dutch, Flemish and German Parliaments - provided technology assessment services to the Science and Technology Options Assessment unit of the European Parliament, in Brussels and Strasbourg.

POST Africa Programme
From 2001 POST received a growing number of requests for advice from parliamentarians in developing countries. It became clear that a real need existed to strengthen capacity in developing country parliaments. In 2005, POST held discussions on this issue with the Gatsby Foundation, which led to a special initiative to assist African Parliaments, and other organisations in their countries, in building parliamentary capacity to handle policy issues related to science and technology. At a time when there is growing awareness of the importance of science and technology in decision making, as demonstrated by, for example, the focus on science, technology and innovation at the African Union summit meeting in January 2007, this programme continues to contribute towards the overall objective of ensuring that parliaments have the capacity to scrutinise decision making processes and act as the national fora for discussion and debate on the broad implications of issues with a basis in science and technology. By sharing information and best practice with overseas parliaments and assemblies, the programme supports one of the primary objectives of the House: to promote public knowledge and understanding of the work and role of Parliament through the provision of information and access.

The POST Board
(Appointed 2010)

The POST Board oversees POST's objectives, outputs and future work programme. It meets quarterly. The Board comprises:
 14 parliamentarians drawn from the House of Commons (10) and the House of Lords (4), roughly reflecting the balance of parties in Parliament.
 Leading non-parliamentarians from the science and technology community.
 Representatives of the House of Lords and the Department of Information Services of the House of Commons.

Officers
Chairman: Adam Afriyie MP
Vice-Chairman: Professor the Lord Winston
Head: Dr Grant Hill-Cawthorne

House of Lords
Lord Oxburgh, KBE, PhD, FRS
Lord Haskel
Lord Patel, KT, FMedSci, FRSE

Externals 
Professor Elizabeth Fisher
Professor Sarah Whatmore, FBA
Paul Martynenko, FBCS
Professor Sir Bernard Silverman, FRS, FAcSS

Ex Officio Board Members
Penny Young, The House of Commons Librarian and Managing Director Research & Information, House of Commons
Nicolas Besly, Clerk of Select Committees, House of Lords
Edward Potton, Head of Science and Environment Section, House of Commons Library
Lynn Gardner, Principal Clerk, Committee Office, House of Commons
Dr Grant Hill-Cawthorne, Head of POST

Staff

Permanent staff
POST has eight science advisers, covering the fields of biology and health; physical sciences and ICT; environment and energy; and social sciences. Science advisers generally have a postgraduate qualification and science policy experience.

Fellows
POST runs formal fellowship schemes with scientific societies and research councils, whereby PhD students can spend three months working at POST through an extension of their maintenance grants. These include:

Arts and Humanities Research Council
Biotechnology and Biological Sciences Research Council
British Ecological Society
British Psychological Society 
Economic and Social Research Council
Engineering and Physical Sciences Research Council 
The Institute of Food Science and Technology
Institute of Physics
Medical Research Council
Natural Environment Research Council 
Nuffield Foundation Flowers Fellowship
Royal Society of Chemistry
Science & Technology Facilities Council
Wellcome Trust Ethics and Society
Wellcome Trust Medical History and Humanities

The Following two organisations collaborate to offer an annual Fellowship in memory of the late Chemical Engineer and Parliamentarian Ashok Kumar MP.  This Fellowship enables an Engineering or Science PhD student to spend three months working at POST and get a better understanding of how parliament works. By 2017 the 6th Ashok Kumar Fellow had been appointed to work with POST she was a postgraduate engineering student, Erin Johnson, from Imperial College, London.

 Institution of Chemical Engineers (IChemE)
 Northeast of England Process Industry Cluster (NEPIC)

For more information on fellowship applications see the 'POST Fellowships' section of the POST website.

See also
 Ashok Kumar (British politician)
 Institution of Chemical Engineers (IChemE)
 Northeast of England Process Industry Cluster (NEPIC)
 Parliamentary and Scientific Committee

References

External links
 

Parliament of the United Kingdom
Scientific organisations based in the United Kingdom
Technology assessment organisations
1989 establishments in the United Kingdom